Henry Meredyth may refer to:
Henry Meredyth (died 1715), Irish Member of Parliament for Kells and Navan
Henry Meredyth (died 1789), Irish Member of Parliament for the borough of Armagh
 three of the Meredyth baronets were named Henry